Ready for Anything is a 1977 Italian romance film written and directed by  Giorgio Stegani and starring Eleonora Giorgi and Bekim Fehmiu.

Plot

Cast 
Eleonora Giorgi as Anna
Bekim Fehmiu as Marco
 Barbara Magnolfi as Paola
Laura De Marchi as  Marco's Wife
Vittorio Duse as The Butler

References

External links

Ready for Anything at Variety Distribution

1977 romantic drama films
1977 films
Italian romantic drama films
1970s Italian films